Horst Assmy (29 November 1933 – 14 January 1972) was a German footballer who played as a forward. Assmy played in East Germany for Einheit Pankow, Motor Oberschöneweide and Vorwärts Berlin, and won 12 caps for the national team, scoring 4 goals. He defected as a republikflucht to West Germany in 1959, appearing for Tennis Borussia Berlin, Schalke 04 and Hessen Kassel.

References

External links
 
 
 
 
 

1933 births
1972 deaths
Footballers from Berlin
German footballers
East German footballers
East Germany international footballers
East German defectors
Association football forwards
VfB Einheit zu Pankow players
1. FC Union Berlin players
1. FC Frankfurt players
Tennis Borussia Berlin players
FC Schalke 04 players
KSV Hessen Kassel players
DDR-Oberliga players
20th-century German people